Pine Creek is a  tributary of the Mississippi River in Winona and Houston counties, Minnesota, United States. Pine Creek joins the Mississippi southeast of La Crescent, Minnesota, directly across from La Crosse, Wisconsin.

History
Pine Creek was named for the white pine trees near its banks. There is also a South Fork Pine Creek that flows into Pine Creek.  Pine Creek flows through the city of New Hartford, Minnesota. This Pine Creek is in the eastern end of Winona County and should not be confused with Pine Creek (Rush Creek tributary) in the western region of the county.

See also
List of rivers of Minnesota

References

Minnesota Watersheds
USGS Geographic Names Information Service
USGS Hydrologic Unit Map - State of Minnesota (1974)

Rivers of Minnesota
Rivers of Houston County, Minnesota
Rivers of Winona County, Minnesota
Tributaries of the Mississippi River